Todd Thomas may refer to:

 Speech (rapper) (Todd Thomas, born 1968), American rapper and musician
 Todd Thomas (American football) (1959–2000), gridiron football player
 Todd Thomas (designer) (born 1961), fashion designer